Craugastor aurilegulus is a species of frog in the family Craugastoridae.
It is endemic to Honduras.
Its natural habitats are subtropical or tropical moist lowland forest, subtropical or tropical moist montane forest, and rivers. The species is threatened by habitat loss.

References

A
Endemic fauna of Honduras
Amphibians of Honduras
Frogs of North America
Endangered fauna of North America
Amphibians described in 1988
Taxonomy articles created by Polbot